Brian Edward Peters (born October 31, 1988) is a former American football linebacker. He played college football at Northwestern University. He was a member of the Saskatchewan Roughriders team in the Canadian Football League (CFL) that won the 101st Grey Cup in 2013. Peters has also been a member of the Iowa Barnstormers, Omaha Nighthawks, Minnesota Vikings, Houston Texans, and Houston Roughnecks.

Early years
Peters attended Pickerington High School Central in Pickerington, Ohio, where he was a two-time first-team All-district, first-team All-county and first-team All-Ohio Capital Conference selection from 2005 to 2006, as well as a second-team All-state selection in 2006. He registered 127 tackles, 4 interceptions and 8 pass breakups as a senior, and also added 32 receptions (as a tight end) for 493 yards, helping the Tigers finish the 2006 season as the Division II state runners-up, regional champions and OCC champions. He also served as the Tigers' placekicker, booting 53-of-55 PAT's and 4-of-8 field goals. He finished his high school career with 277 tackles and 18 interceptions (7 in both 2004 and 2005). He was selected to play in the 2007 Ohio North-South All-Star game, as well as the OCC All-Star game.

Peters also lettered in baseball and track & field at Pickerington, where he was team captain in baseball, playing center fielder and pitcher. In track, he leaped 6.25 meters (20 feet, 5.25 inches) in the long jump event at the 2007 District Meet, and ran the 200-meter dash in 24.10 seconds. He also played one year of basketball.

Regarded as a two-star recruit by Rivals.com, Peters was ranked 75th among all players in the state of Ohio by SuperPrep.

College career
Peters played for the Northwestern Wildcats from 2008 to 2011. He was redshirted in 2007. He recorded 92 tackles, five interceptions, one sack and two forced fumbles his senior season, earning First-team All-Big Ten as well as Academic All-Big Ten honors. Peters was also team co-captain his senior year. He accumulated 107 tackles, three interceptions and one forced fumble his junior year in 2010, garnering Second-team All-Big Ten as well as Academic All-Big Ten accolades. He played in 52 games, starting 34, during his college career, recording totals of twelve interceptions, six forced fumbles, 23 pass breakups and a school record setting 301 total tackles.

Professional career

Iowa Barnstormers
Peters signed with the Iowa Barnstormers of the Arena Football League on July 5, 2012. He recorded 13.5 tackles and one fumble recovery during his time with the Barnstormers.

Omaha Nighthawks
Peters was signed by the Omaha Nighthawks of the United Football League in 2012 and released by the team before the start of the 2012 season.

Saskatchewan Roughriders
Peters joined the Saskatchewan Roughriders' practice roster in 2012 and signed with the team in January 2013. The Roughriders won the 101st Grey Cup against the Hamilton Tiger-Cats on November 24, 2013. Peters had five special teams tackles during the game.

Minnesota Vikings
On February 23, 2015, the NFL's Minnesota Vikings announced that they had signed Peters. He was released by the Vikings on September 5 and signed to the team's practice squad on September 6, 2015.

Houston Texans
Peters was signed off the Vikings' practice squad by the Houston Texans on September 30, 2015. He made his NFL debut on October 4, 2015 against the Atlanta Falcons. He recorded 17 special teams tackles in 2015, which tied for the league lead with Johnson Bademosi and Cedric Peerman. As of 2018, he is one of the Texans' six team captains due to his outstanding play on special teams.

On December 24, 2018, Peters was placed on injured reserve.

Houston Roughnecks
Peters signed with the XFL's Team 9 practice squad during the regular season. He signed with the Houston Roughnecks on March 9, 2020. He had his contract terminated when the league suspended operations on April 10, 2020.

References

External links
Just Sports Stats
Saskatchewan Roughriders bio

Living people
1988 births
Players of American football from Ohio
American football linebackers
Canadian football linebackers
American players of Canadian football
Northwestern Wildcats football players
Iowa Barnstormers players
Saskatchewan Roughriders players
Minnesota Vikings players
Houston Texans players
People from Pickerington, Ohio
Team 9 players
Houston Roughnecks players